In geometry, the Euler line, named after Leonhard Euler, is a line determined from any triangle that is not equilateral. It is a central line of the triangle, and it passes through several important points determined from the triangle, including the orthocenter, the circumcenter, the centroid, the Exeter point and the center of the nine-point circle of the triangle.

The concept of a triangle's Euler line extends to the Euler line of other shapes, such as the quadrilateral and the tetrahedron.

Triangle centers on the Euler line

Individual centers
Euler showed in 1765 that in any triangle, the orthocenter, circumcenter and centroid are collinear. This property is also true for another triangle center, the nine-point center, although it had not been defined in Euler's time. In equilateral triangles, these four points coincide, but in any other triangle they are all distinct from each other, and the Euler line is determined by any two of them.

Other notable points that lie on the Euler line include the de Longchamps point, the Schiffler point, the Exeter point, and the Gossard perspector. However, the incenter generally does not lie on the Euler line; it is on the Euler line only for isosceles triangles, for which the Euler line coincides with the symmetry axis of the triangle and contains all triangle centers.

The tangential triangle of a reference triangle is tangent to the latter's circumcircle at the reference triangle's vertices. The circumcenter of the tangential triangle lies on the Euler line of the reference triangle.  The center of similitude of the orthic and tangential triangles is also on the Euler line.

A vector proof
Let  be a triangle. A proof of the fact that the circumcenter , the centroid  and the orthocenter  are collinear relies on free vectors. We start by stating the prerequisites. First,  satisfies the relation

Further, the problem of Sylvester reads as

Now, using the vector addition, we deduce that

By adding these three relations, term by term, we obtain that

In Dörrie's book, the Euler line and the problem of Sylvester are put together into a single proof. However, most of the proofs of the problem of Sylvester rely on the fundamental properties of free vectors, independently of the Euler line.

Distances between centers

On the Euler line the centroid G is between the circumcenter O and the orthocenter H and is twice as far from the orthocenter as it is from the circumcenter:

The segment GH is a diameter of the orthocentroidal circle.

The center N of the nine-point circle lies along the Euler line midway between the orthocenter and the circumcenter:

Thus the Euler line could be repositioned on a number line with the circumcenter O at the location 0, the centroid G at 2t, the nine-point center at 3t, and the orthocenter H at 6t for some scale factor t.

Furthermore, the squared distance between the centroid and the circumcenter along the Euler line is less than the squared circumradius R2 by an amount equal to one-ninth the sum of the squares of the side lengths a, b, and c:

In addition,

Representation

Equation

Let A, B, C denote the vertex angles of the reference triangle, and let x : y : z be a variable point in trilinear coordinates; then an equation for the Euler line is

An equation for the Euler line in barycentric coordinates  is

Parametric representation

Another way to represent the Euler line is in terms of a parameter t.  Starting with the circumcenter (with trilinear coordinates ) and the orthocenter (with trilinears  every point on the Euler line, except the orthocenter, is given by the trilinear coordinates

formed as a linear combination of the trilinears of these two points, for some t.

For example:
 The circumcenter has trilinears  corresponding to the parameter value 
 The centroid has trilinears  corresponding to the parameter value 
 The nine-point center has trilinears  corresponding to the parameter value 
 The de Longchamps point has trilinears  corresponding to the parameter value

Slope

Then these slopes are related according to

Thus the slope of the Euler line (if finite) is expressible in terms of the slopes of the sides as

Moreover, the Euler line is parallel to an acute triangle's side BC if and only if

Relation to inscribed equilateral triangles

The locus of the centroids of equilateral triangles inscribed in a given triangle is formed by two lines perpendicular to the given triangle's Euler line.

In special triangles

Right triangle

In a right triangle, the Euler line coincides with the median to the hypotenuse—that is, it goes through both the right-angled vertex and the midpoint of the side opposite that vertex. This is because the right triangle's orthocenter, the intersection of its altitudes, falls on the right-angled vertex while its circumcenter, the intersection of its perpendicular bisectors of sides, falls on the midpoint of the hypotenuse.

Isosceles triangle

The Euler line of an isosceles triangle coincides with the axis of symmetry. In an isosceles triangle the incenter falls on the Euler line.

Automedian triangle

The Euler line of an automedian triangle (one whose medians are in the same proportions, though in the opposite order, as the sides) is perpendicular to one of the medians.

Systems of triangles with concurrent Euler lines

Consider a triangle ABC with Fermat–Torricelli points F1 and F2. The Euler lines of the 10 triangles with vertices chosen from A, B, C, F1 and F2 are concurrent at the centroid of triangle ABC.

The Euler lines of the four triangles formed by an orthocentric system (a set of four points such that each is the orthocenter of the triangle with vertices at the other three points) are concurrent at the nine-point center common to all of the triangles.

Generalizations

Quadrilateral

In a convex quadrilateral, the quasiorthocenter H, the "area centroid" G, and the quasicircumcenter O are collinear in this order on the Euler line, and HG = 2GO.

Tetrahedron

A tetrahedron is a three-dimensional object bounded by four triangular faces.  Seven lines associated with a tetrahedron are concurrent at its centroid; its six midplanes intersect at its Monge point; and there is a circumsphere passing through all of the vertices, whose center is the circumcenter. These points define the "Euler line" of a tetrahedron analogous to that of a triangle. The centroid is the midpoint between its Monge point and circumcenter along this line. The center of the twelve-point sphere also lies on the Euler line.

Simplicial polytope

A simplicial polytope is a polytope whose facets are all simplices (plural of simplex). For example, every polygon is a simplicial polytope. The Euler line associated to such a polytope is the line determined by its centroid and circumcenter of mass. This definition of an Euler line generalizes the ones above.

Suppose that  is a polygon.

1.

2. If  has a center of rotational symmetry , then .

3. If all but one of the sides of  have equal length, then  is orthogonal to the last side.

Related constructions
A triangle's Kiepert parabola is the unique parabola that is tangent to the sides (two of them extended) of the triangle and has the Euler line as its directrix.

References

External links 
 An interactive applet showing several triangle centers that lies on the Euler line.
 "Euler Line" and "Non-Euclidean Triangle Continuum" at the Wolfram Demonstrations Project
 Nine-point conic and Euler line generalization, A further Euler line generalization, and The quasi-Euler line of a quadrilateral and a hexagon at Dynamic Geometry Sketches
 Bogomolny, Alexander, "Altitudes and the Euler Line" and "Euler Line and 9-Point Circle", Cut-the-Knot
 
 Archived at Ghostarchive and the Wayback Machine: 
 

Straight lines defined for a triangle